Flintlock were a 1970s pop group from Essex, England. Its members were Derek Pascoe (vocals/saxophone), Mike Holoway (drums/percussion), Jamie Stone
(bass/vocals), John Summerton (guitar/vocals) and Bill Rice (keyboards).

Career
The group began under the name The Young Revivals, but after two years changed their name to Flintlock. They came to national attention in the mid-1970s through regular appearances on the British children's television programmes You Must Be Joking and Pauline's Quirkes, the latter hosted by the then teenage actress Pauline Quirke. Flintlock also appeared on programmes such as Blue Peter, Magpie and Top of the Pops, and their own programme Fanfare.

Holoway also became known as an actor in the children's cult TV drama programme The Tomorrow People, in which Flintlock made a guest appearance in the Series 5 story The Heart of Sogguth.

Flintlock had one Top 30 hit single in the UK Singles Chart, "Dawn", in the summer of 1976.

A one-off reunion concert took place in 2007.

Discography

Singles
"Learn to Cry" (August 1975)
"A Little Bit of Lovin'" (February 1976)
"Dawn" (April 1976)
"Sea of Flames" (July 1976)
"Russian Roulette" (November 1976)
"Carry Me" (March 1977)
"Anything for You" (September 1977)
"Mony Mony" (February 1978)
"(Hey You) You're like A Magnet" (January 1979)

Three further singles were released in Japan:
"Amorous Lady" (1977)
"Taken All Away" (1978)
"Get With The Boys" (1979)

Albums
On the Way (December 1975)
Hot from the Lock (December 1976)
Tears 'n' Cheers (October 1977)
Stand Alone (February 1979)

A greatest hits album was also released in Japan and Germany.

References

English pop music groups